The Meridian Micropolitan Statistical Area is a micropolitan area in east central Mississippi that covers three counties - Clarke, Kemper, and Lauderdale. As of the 2000 census, the μSA had a population of 106,569 (though a July 1, 2009 estimate placed the population at 106,139). 
According to the 2010 Census, the population is of 107,449.

Counties
Clarke
Kemper
Lauderdale

Communities

Cities
Meridian (Principal City)
Quitman

Towns
De Kalb
Enterprise
Marion
Pachuta
Scooba
Shubuta 
Stonewall

Census-designated places
Collinsville
Meridian Station
Nellieburg

Unincorporated places
Bailey
Daleville
De Soto
Electric Mills
Kewanee
Lauderdale
Moscow
Porterville
Preston
Russell
Toomsuba
Wahalak
Whynot

Demographics
As of the census of 2000, there were 106,569 people, 40,877 households, and 28,384 families residing within the μSA. The racial makeup of the μSA was 58.81% White, 39.57% African American, 0.35% Native American, 0.39% Asian, 0.02% Pacific Islander, 0.29% from other races, and 0.56% from two or more races. Hispanic or Latino of any race were 1.02% of the population.

There were 40,877 households, out of which 33.6% had children under the age of 18 living with them, 47.6% were married couples living together, 18.0% had a female householder with no husband present, and 30.6% were non-families. 27.4% of all households were made up of individuals, and 11.8% had someone living alone who was 65 years of age or older. The average household size was 2.54 and the average family size was 3.08.

In the μSA the population was spread out, with 26.5% under the age of 18, 9.9% from 18 to 24, 27.5% from 25 to 44, 21.7% from 45 to 64, and 14.4% who were 65 years of age or older. The median age was 36 years. For every 100 females, there were 90.9 males. For every 100 females age 18 and over, there were 86.1 males.

The median income for a household in the μSA was $27,125, and the median income for a family was $33,742. Males had a median income of $27,693 versus $19,571 for females. The per capita income for the μSA was $14,100.

See also
List of metropolitan areas in Mississippi
List of micropolitan areas in Mississippi
List of cities in Mississippi
List of towns and villages in Mississippi
List of census-designated places in Mississippi
List of United States metropolitan areas

References

 
Geography of Lauderdale County, Mississippi
Geography of Kemper County, Mississippi
Geography of Clarke County, Mississippi